Shauna Gambill (born 22 September 1976) is a beauty queen from Acton, California who has held the Miss Teen USA title and competed in the Miss USA and Miss World pageants.

Gambill first won the Miss California Teen USA title in late 1993. In August 1994 she competed in the Miss Teen USA in the national pageant televised live from Biloxi, Mississippi. Her performance in the preliminary competition placed her fourth among the top twelve semi-finalists, but her scores were consistently high throughout the three final rounds of competition, ranking highest in swimsuit (16 August). Having impressed the finals judges, Gambill, aged 17, was crowned Miss Teen USA at the end of the pageant broadcast.

In 1997, two years after passing on the Miss Teen USA crown, she won the Miss California USA 1998 title. Gambill then competed at Miss USA 1998, where she placed first runner-up to Shawnae Jebbia of Massachusetts.

Gambill was selected to represent the United States as Miss World USA 1998 (now known as US Miss World) and represented the United States at the Miss World 1998 pageant, where she was a semi-finalist. She is also the first Miss Teen USA to compete at Miss World.

Gambill attended Highland High School in Palmdale, California and was valedictorian of her class. She married Mitch Gerth in Santa Barbara, California on 23 October 2000, In 2004, she was a judge at the Miss Teen USA pageant won by Shelley Hennig of Louisiana.

References

External links
Miss California USA official website
Miss USA official website

Living people
1977 births
Miss Teen USA winners
1994 beauty pageant contestants
20th-century Miss Teen USA delegates
Miss USA 1998 delegates
Miss World 1998 delegates
Female models from California
People from Acton, California
21st-century American women